Heliactinidia dispar is a moth of the subfamily Arctiinae. It was described by Warren in 1907. It is found in Argentina.

References

Arctiinae
Moths described in 1907